Catherine Paterson  may refer to:

Katherine Paterson, American author
Kathryn Paterson, Chief Censor of New Zealand

See also
Kathy Patterson, politician
Katie Paterson, artist